ITJ may refer to:

Instituto Tecnológico de Jiquilpan
Institute of Traditional Judaism
Instituto Thomas Jefferson